Ken Bennett (born 1959) is an American politician.

Ken Bennett may also refer to:

 Ken Bennett (Australian footballer) (born 1940), played for Collingwood
 Ken Bennett (English footballer) (1921–1994), played for Southend United, Bournemouth, Brighton & Hove Albion, Crystal Palace